WKF may refer to:

WKF, the IATA code for Air Force Base Waterkloof, Gauteng, South Africa
WKF, the National Rail code for Wakefield Westgate railway station, West Yorkshire, England
World Karate Federation, the largest international governing body of sport karate with 198 member countries